Nalpur is a census town in Sankrail CD Block of Howrah Sadar subdivision in Howrah district in the Indian state of West Bengal. It is a part of Kolkata Urban Agglomeration.

Geography

Demographics
As per 2011 Census of India Nalpur had a total population of 6,911 of which 3,470 (50%) were males and 3,441 (50%) were females. Population below 6 years was 919. The total number of literates in Nalpur was 4,813 (80.32% of the population over 6 years).

Nalpur was part of Kolkata Urban Agglomeration in 2011 census.

 India census, Nalpur had a population of 5644. Males constitute 50% of the population and females 50%. Nalpur has an average literacy rate of 61%, higher than the national average of 59.5%; with 55% of the males and 45% of females literate. 16% of the population is under 6 years of age.

Transport
Nalpur railway station on Howrah-Kharagpur line serves the locality.

References

Cities and towns in Howrah district
Neighbourhoods in Kolkata
Kolkata Metropolitan Area